Shiawassee County is a county located in the U.S. state of Michigan. As of the 2020 United States Census, the population was 68,094. The county seat is Corunna, and the largest city in the county is Owosso. In 2010, the center of population of Michigan was located in Shiawassee County, in Bennington Township.

Shiawassee County is included in the Lansing-East Lansing, MI Metropolitan Statistical Area.

History
In 1822, the Michigan Territorial legislature defined a new county, Shiawassee (named for the river), taken from portions of existing Oakland and St. Clair counties. However, for purposes of representation, revenue, and judicial matters, the area was temporarily assigned to adjoining county governments. In early 1837, the Michigan Territory was admitted into the Union as the State of Michigan, and that same year the new Michigan State government authorized the organization of a county government in Shiawassee.

Geography
The Shiawassee River enters it from Genesee County in the southeast and flows through Corunna and Owosso in the center of the county, exiting to Saginaw County in the north. Shiawassee County is considered to be a part of Central Michigan.

Adjacent counties

 Saginaw County – north
 Genesee County – east
 Livingston County – southeast
 Ingham County – southwest
 Clinton County – west
 Gratiot County – northwest

Transportation

Highways
  - enters near SW corner of county. Runs ENE past Shaftsburg, Perry, Morrice, Bancroft, Durand. Exits running east into Genesee County.
  - runs along the east line of county, from NE corner to intersection with I69 one mile (1.6 km) south of Lennon.
  - runs east-west through upper middle of county, passing Corunna and Owosso.
  - enters north line of county at Oakley. Runs south to Owosso, then SW and south to Perry. Exits running south into Ingham County.
  - begins at Owosso. Runs ESE to intersection with I69, one mile (1.6 km) NW of Durand.

Rail
 Durand Union Station in Durand offers access to Amtrak's Blue Water route. The train runs from Port Huron to Chicago.

Airport
Owosso Community Airport – 2 miles (3.2 km) east of Owosso. Public airport for general aviation, primarily smaller aircraft.

Demographics

As of the 2010 United States Census, Shiawassee County had a 2010 population of 70,648. This decrease of -1,039 people from the 2000 United States Census represents a decrease of 1.4% during that ten-year period. In 2010 there were 27,481 households and 19,397 families in the county. The population density was 133.1 per square mile (51.4 square kilometers). There were 30,319 housing units at an average density of 57.1 per square mile (22.0 per km2). 96.7% of the population were White, 0.5% Native American, 0.5% Black or African American, 0.4% Asian, 0.5% of some other race and 1.5% of two or more races. 2.4% were Hispanic or Latino (of any race). 22.2% were of German, 21.8% English, 9.5% Irish, 5.2% French, French Canadian or Cajun and 5.1% Polish ancestry according to 2010 American Community Survey.

There were 27,481 households, out of which 32.5% had children under the age of 18 living with them, 53.8% were husband and wife families, 11.6% had a female householder with no husband present, 29.4% were non-families, and 24.2% were made up of individuals. The average household size was 2.54 and the average family size was 2.99.

The county population contained 24.1% under age of 18, 8.5% from 18 to 24, 23.9% from 25 to 44, 29.1% from 45 to 64, and 14.3% who were 65 years of age or older. The median age was 40 years. For every 100 females there were 97.7 males. For every 100 females age 18 and over, there were 94.6 males.

The 2010 American Community Survey 1-year estimate indicates the median income for a household in the county was $46,528 and the median income for a family was $52,614. Males had a median income of $32,155 versus $19,301 for females. The per capita income for the county was $21,103. About 10.6% of families and 15.4% of the population were below the poverty line, including 22.1% of those under the age 18 and 5.8% of those age 65 or over.

Government
Shiawassee County has tended to vote Republican since the beginning. Since 1884, the Republican Party nominee has carried 74% of the elections (25 of 34).

The county government operates the jail, maintains rural roads, operates the major local courts, records deeds, mortgages, and vital records, administers public health regulations, and participates with the state in the provision of social services. The county board of commissioners controls the budget and has limited authority to make laws or ordinances. In Michigan, most local government functions — police and fire, building and zoning, tax assessment, street maintenance, etc. — are the responsibility of individual cities and townships.

COVID-19 hazard pay scandal
On July 25, 2021, it was revealed that the county's board of commissioners paid themselves a total of $65,000 out of a $557,000 federal relief funds earmarked for county employee hazard pay due to the COVID-19 pandemic. Employees typically received $1,000 to $2,000. The seven member board of commissioners voted themselves $5,000 for four members, $10,000 for two, and the chairman of the county commissioners $25,000. Following days of criticism, a Shiawassee prosecutor declared the bonuses illegal; commissioners responded that they would return the money.

Elected officials

 Governor: Gretchen Whitmer (D)
 Lt. Governor: Garlin Gilchrist (D)
 Attorney General: Dana Nessel (D)
 Secretary of State: Jocelyn Benson  (D)
 U.S. Rep 7th District: Elissa Slotkin (D)
 State Senator 28th District: Sam Singh (D)
 State Rep. 71st District: Brian Begole (R)
 Prosecutor: Scott Koerner (R)
 Sheriff: Doug Chapman (R)
 County Clerk: Caroline Wilson (R)
 County Treasurer: Julie Sorenson (R)
 Register of Deeds: Lori Kimble (R)
 Drain Commissioner: Tony Newman (D)
 County Surveyor: William Wascher (R)
 Road Commissioners: Mike Constine (R); Ric Crawford (R); John Michalec (D)
 Commissioner District 1: Marlene Webster (R)
 Commissioner District 2: Greg Brodeur (R)
 Commissioner District 3: Gary Holzhausen (R)
 Commissioner District 4: Bill Johnson (R)
 Commissioner District 5: Brad Howard (R)
 Commissioner District 6: Cindy Garber (R)
 Commissioner District 7: Tom Emery (R)

(information as of January 2023)

Communities

Cities

 Corunna (county seat)
 Durand
 Laingsburg
 Ovid (partial)
 Owosso
 Perry

Villages

 Bancroft
 Byron
 Lennon 
 Morrice
 New Lothrop
 Vernon

Charter townships
 Caledonia Charter Township
 Owosso Charter Township

Civil townships

 Antrim Township
 Bennington Township
 Burns Township
 Fairfield Township
 Hazelton Township
 Middlebury Township
 New Haven Township
 Perry Township
 Rush Township
 Sciota Township
 Shiawassee Township
 Venice Township
 Vernon Township
 Woodhull Township

Census-designated places
 Henderson
 Middletown

Other unincorporated communities

 Antrim Center
 Bennington
 Burton
 Carland
 Easton
 Five Points
 Five Points North
 Forest Green Estates
 Hoovers Corners
 Juddville
 Kerby
 Newburg
 New Haven
 Nicholson
 Olney Corners
 Pittsburg
 Shaftsburg
 Shiawasseetown
 Smith Crossing
 Union Plains
 Wolf Crossing

See also
 List of Michigan State Historic Sites in Shiawassee County, Michigan
 McArthur Mining Company – Michigan's first coal mine.
 National Register of Historic Places listings in Shiawassee County, Michigan

References

External links
 Shiawassee County History
 Shiawassee County website
 City of Corunna, Michigan
 
 Owosso Independent

 
Michigan counties
1837 establishments in Michigan
Populated places established in 1837